Datong is a prefecture-level city in northern Shanxi Province in the People's Republic of China. As of the 2020 census, it had a population of 3,105,591 of whom 1,790,452 lived in the built-up (or metro) area made of the 2 out 4 urban districts of Pingcheng and Yungang as Yunzhou and Xinrong are not conurbated yet.

History

The area of present-day Datong was close to the state of Dai, which was conquered by the Zhao clan of Jin in 457 BC. It was a frontier land between the agricultural Chinese and the nomads of the Great Steppe. The area was well known for its trade in horses.

The area of present-day Datong eventually came under the control of the Qin dynasty, during which it was known as Pingcheng County (平城县) and formed part of the Qin commandery of Yanmen. Pingcheng County continued under the Han dynasty, which founded a site within present-day Datong in 200BC following its victory against the Xiongnu nomads at the Battle of Baideng. Located near a pass to Inner Mongolia along the Great Wall, Pingcheng blossomed under Han rule and became a stop-off point for camel caravans moving from China into Mongolia and beyond. It was sacked at the end of the Eastern Han. Pingcheng became the capital of the Xianbei-founded Northern Wei dynasty from AD398–494. The Yungang Grottoes were constructed during the later part of this period (460–494). During the mid to late 520s, Pingcheng was the seat of Northern Wei's Dai Commandery. During the Tang dynasty, Datong became the seat of the Tang prefecture of Yunzhou, and the original Guandi temple was built.

The city was renamed Datong in 1048. It was the Xijing ("Western Capital") of the Jurchen Jin dynasty prior to being sacked by the Mongols. Datong later came under the control of the Ming dynasty, serving as an important Ming military stronghold against the Mongols to the north. During the Ming period, many of Datong's notable historical structures such as the Drum Tower and the Nine-Dragon Wall were built. Datong was sacked again at the end of the Ming in 1649, but promptly rebuilt in 1652.

By 1982 a portion of its city walls remained so it became one of the National Famous Historical and Cultural Cities that year. Prior to 2008, about 100,000 people lived in the old city. In 2008 mayor Geng Yanbo decided to redevelop much of the inner city, with over  being redeveloped, and with Geng becoming known as the "Demolition Mayor". Geng and his group anticipated that 30,000 to 50,000 people would remain in the old city.

In 2013 Geng left his position. Su Jiede of Sixth Tone wrote that much of the city was still under construction at the time and that Geng's efforts resulted in "a half-finished city center and a complicated legacy" and that "To critics, the city had spent enormous sums of money without much to show for it." By 2020 the population of the old city was below 30,000 and there were fewer governmental facilities available for the residents. That year Su stated that the old city "still presents a headache for the local government."

Demographics
Su Jiede wrote that since Pingcheng District, which had most of its urbanized area, had 1,105,699 people as of 2020, "Datong is a small city by Chinese standards".

Geography

Datong is the northernmost city of Shanxi, and is located in the Datong Basin, with an administrative area spanning latitude 39° 03'–40° 44' N and longitude 112° 34'–114° 33' E. The urban area is surrounded on three sides by mountains, with passes only to the east and southwest. Within the prefecture-level city elevations generally increase from southeast to northwest. Datong borders Ulanqab (Inner Mongolia) to the northwest and Zhangjiakou (Hebei) to the east, Shuozhou (Shanxi) to the southwest, and Xinzhou (Shanxi) to the south.

The well-known Datong Volcanic Arc lies nearby in the Datong Basin.

Climate
Datong has a continental, monsoon-influenced steppe climate (Köppen BSk), influenced by the + elevation, with rather long, cold, very dry winters, and very warm summers. Due to the aridity and elevation, diurnal temperature variation is often large, averaging  annually. With monthly percent possible sunshine ranging from 54% in July to 66% in October, sunshine is abundant year-round, and the city receives 2,671 hours (about 60% of the possible total) of bright sunshine per year.

Administrative divisions

Defunct – Kuang District is largely made up of separate mines throughout the metropolitan area.

Tourism
There are over 50,000 carved images and statues of Buddhas and bodhisattvas within these grottoes, ranging from 4 centimeters to 7 meters tall. Most of these icons are around 1000 years old.

Within the city itself, there are a few surviving sites of historical interest such as the Nine-Dragon Wall, the Huayan Monastery (Huáyán Sì), and the Shanhua Temple. Further afield is the Hanging Temple built into a cliff face near Mount Heng. Most of the historical sites in this region date to the Tang and Ming dynasties, but the Hanging Temple dates to the Northern Wei dynasty (386–534).

The railway locomotive works (see below) began to attract increasing numbers of railway enthusiasts from the 1970s. When the construction of steam locomotives was phased out, the authorities did not want to lose this valuable tourism market, and pondered the possibility of developing a steam railway operating center as an attraction. A number of study visits were undertaken to the East Lancashire Railway at Bury, and a twinning arrangement was concluded with that town.

In 2010, work began on reconstructing the city's 14th century Ming dynasty defensive wall. The controversial reconstruction project was in its final phase at the end of 2014. The documentary The Chinese Mayor documents two years of vigorous and highly controversial (due to summary demolition of about 200,000 homes) effort by Mayor Geng Yanbo to push the reconstruction project forward.

Culture
Datong is known for its knife-cut noodles.

Economy
The GDP per capita was ¥17,852 (US$2,570) per annum in 2008, ranked no. 242 among 659 Chinese cities. Coal mining is the dominant industry of Datong. Its history and development are very much linked to this commodity.

Development zones
Datong Economic and Technological Development Zone

Due to its strategic position, it is also an important distribution and warehousing center for Shanxi, Hebei and Inner Mongolia.

Datong is an old fashioned coal mining city, and still sits on significant reserves of this commodity. Consequently, it has developed a reputation as one of China's most polluted cities. The Datong Coal Mining Group is based here and is China's third largest such enterprise. Datong is indeed however an emerging economy, as the city seeks to loosen its dependence on coal, introduce more environmentally friendly and efficient methods of extraction and move into other areas of business services. The local government has continued to upgrade its pillar coal sector (and related industries like coal chemicals, power and metallurgy), while also developing "substitute industries" such as machinery manufacturing, tourism and distribution, warehousing and logistics services. This has had some impact. Datong's GDP grew by 5.1 percent in 2008 to RMB56.6 billion.

While coal will continue to dominate, Datong has been identified as one of the key cities requiring redevelopment, with part of this being in environmental cleanup, rehabilitation and industrial refocusing. Datong is a pilot city for rehabilitation studies following years of pollution. To this end it has already struck up strong relationships with other cities worldwide with similar backgrounds, and has begun plans, for example, to develop a tourism base focused on steam engine technology with antique locomotives to be used along designated tracks.

Datong has a large railway locomotive works 'Datong locomotive factory', where the 'Aiming Higher' class of steam locomotive was built as late as the 1970s.  Steam locomotive production ended in the late 1980s and the plant's main products (as of 2010) is mainline electric locomotives.

Main enterprises
Datong Coal Mine Group (The third biggest coal-mining enterprise in China)
Datong Electric Locomotive Co., Ltd, (DELC) (The second biggest Elec-Locomotive enterprise in China)
Shanxi Diesel Engine Industries Corporation, Ltd, CNGC
Shanxi Synthetic Rubber Group Co., Ltd, CNCC
GD Power Datong No.2 Power Plant
GD Power Datong Power Generation Co., Ltd
Shanxi Datang International Yungang Co-generation Co., Ltd.
China National Heavy Duty Truck Group Datong Gear CO., LTD

Transportation
China National Highway 109
China National Highway 208
G55 Erenhot–Guangzhou Expressway
G5501 Datong Ring Expressway
Datong railway station and Datong South railway station
Datong Yungang Airport

Education

Colleges and universities
 Datong University

Major schools
 Datong No.1 Middle School
 Datong No.2 Middle School
 Datong Locomotive Middle School
 Datong No.3 Middle School
 BeiYue Middle School
 Datong Experimental Secondary School
 The No.1 Middle School of DCMG (Datong Coal Mine Group)
 Datong No.14 Elementary School
 Datong No.18 Elementary School
 Datong Experimental Elementary School

See also

List of twin towns and sister cities in China
 Jumenbu

References

Citations

Bibliography

 .

Further reading
Cotterell, Arthur (2008). The Imperial Capitals of China: An Inside View of the Celestial Empire. Pimlico, London. .

External links

 The Chinese Mayor (documentary) on website International Documentary Festival Amsterdam (IDFA) free to watch as embedded video (hosted on VIMEO)

 

 
Cities in Shanxi
Prefecture-level divisions of Shanxi